Sex Tape is a 2014 American sex comedy film directed by Jake Kasdan and distributed by Sony Pictures Releasing. It was written by Jason Segel, Nicholas Stoller, and Kate Angelo and stars Segel, Cameron Diaz, Rob Corddry, Ellie Kemper, and Rob Lowe. Its story follows a married couple who make a sex tape to spice up their relationship only to wake up the next morning to find that it has gone missing. This sparks a frantic search in an attempt to find it.

The film was produced by Columbia Pictures and was released on July 18, 2014. It grossed $14.6 million in its opening weekend and $126.1 million worldwide, against a budget of $40 million. It received generally negative reviews.

Plot
Jay and Annie Hargrove are a married couple, who, after having two kids, have sex at every opportunity. After he struggles to get an erection, she suggests making a sex tape. They film themselves having sex in every position listed in The Joy of Sex.

When done, Annie asks Jay to delete the recording, which they hate, but he ends up instead inadvertently synchronizing the video to several iPads the couple had given away over time. After failing to get it out of the cloud, they set out to get back all of the gifted iPads, leading to a series of awkward encounters and close calls.

After collecting the iPads and deleting the videos, their friend's son, Howard, threatens to upload a copy of their sex tape to YouPorn unless they give him $25,000. After failing to get the money, they break into the YouPorn headquarters and begin to destroy their web servers. Their plan is quickly thwarted when an alarm sounds. The owner and his guards confront them and threaten to call the police, but agree not to do so in exchange for $15,000 to cover the damage. He also removes their video and explains that all they had to do to have a video removed was send him an e-mail request for such removal.

After they have deleted all videos, Howard comes over to the house and gives Jay the only existing copy of the video on a USB flash drive in exchange for being allowed to hang out with their son, Clive, since he is his only friend.

As the film comes to a close, Jay and Annie decide to watch the video once themselves. Afterwards, they take the USB flash drive containing the video and go outside to smash it with a hammer, blend it, burn it with fire, and bury the remains.

Cast

Production

Development
Sony Pictures acquired the script in June 2011, which was based on an original story created by Kate Angelo. Nicholas Stoller was in early talks to direct but eventually backed out with Jake Kasdan instead directing the picture.  Before Diaz signed on, Reese Witherspoon, Amy Adams, Emily Blunt, Rose Byrne, and Jennifer Garner were all considered for the female lead.

Principal photography began on September 12, 2013, in Newton, Massachusetts. Hank's house is situated in the western Greater Boston suburb of Weston.

Release

On March 17, 2014, the first poster and some photos from the film were released, followed by a red band trailer on April 2, 2014, and a green band trailer on April 24, 2014. On June 5, Sony UK released an international trailer of the film.

On May 30, 2014, the film's release date was pushed up from July 25, 2014 to July 18.

On June 19, a final red band trailer was released, which was attached theatrically with the Melissa McCarthy comedy Tammy.

Indian censorship
The Examining Committee of the Central Board of Film Certification (CBFC) in India rejected its first version of the film. After some changes, they accepted the film and it was released in the country on August 29, 2014.

Box office
At the end of its box office run, Sex Tape earned a gross of $38.5 million in the US and Canada and $87.5 million in other territories, for a worldwide total of $126.1 million against a budget of $40 million.

The film was released in 2,457 theaters in North America and earned $1.1 million in its opening Thursday evening showings. In its opening weekend, the film grossed $14.6 million, finishing in fourth behind Dawn of the Planet of the Apes ($36.2 million), as well as newcomers The Purge: Anarchy ($29.8 million) and Planes: Fire & Rescue ($17.5 million).

The film topped the UK box office in its opening weekend with a gross of £1.43 million. It dropped to number 4 in its second week grossing £673,478. The film opened at #1 in markets like Bulgaria, Netherlands, Slovenia in their respective opening weekend. The biggest market in other territories being Germany, United Kingdom, Australia, where the film earned a gross of $12.14 million, $7.14 million and $6.9 million respectively.

Critical response
Rotten Tomatoes, a review aggregator, reports that 16% of 157 surveyed reviews gave the film a positive review; the average rating is 4.1/10. The site's critical consensus reads, "With neither the conviction to embrace its smutty premise nor enough laughs to function as a worthwhile rom-com, the flaccid Sex Tape suffers from cinematic impotence." On Metacritic, the film has a score of 36 out of 100 based on 36 critics, indicating "generally unfavorable reviews". Audiences polled by CinemaScore gave the film an average grade of "C+" on an A+ to F scale.

Peter Bradshaw of The Guardian called the film "a timely naughty-but-nice romcom with too few laughs", giving it 2/5 stars.

Accolades

See also

References

External links

 
 
 
 

2014 films
2010s sex comedy films
American sex comedy films
2010s English-language films
Films about families
Films about marriage
Films about pornography
Films directed by Jake Kasdan
Films scored by Michael Andrews
Films set in Los Angeles
Films shot in Massachusetts
Escape Artists films
Columbia Pictures films
Media Rights Capital films
Films with screenplays by Nicholas Stoller
2014 comedy films
Golden Raspberry Award winning films
2010s American films